Fence Lake is a 3,483 acre lake in Vilas County, Wisconsin. The communities of Marlands and Lac du Flambeau border the lake. The fish present in the lake are Muskellunge, Panfish, Largemouth Bass, Smallmouth Bass, Northern Pike, Trout and Walleye.

Fish

 Musky (Common)
 Panfish (Common)
 Smallmouth Bass (Common)
 Northern Pike (Common)
 Walleye (Common)
 Largemouth Bass (Present)
 Trout (Present)

See also 
 List of lakes in Wisconsin
 List of lakes in Vilas County, Wisconsin

References

Lakes of Wisconsin
Lakes of Vilas County, Wisconsin